2015 Regional League Division 2 Bangkok Metropolitan Region is the 7th season of the League competition since its establishment in 2009. It is in the third tier of the Thai football league system.

Changes from Last Season

Team Changes

Promoted Clubs

Thai Honda were promoted to the 2015 Thai Division 1 League.

Withdrawn Clubs

Raj-Vithi and Samut Prakan United have withdrawn from the 2015 campaign.

Expansion Clubs

BU Deffo,  Dome and  Army F.C. joined the newly expanded league setup.

Clubs serving bans
 Paknampho NSRU – 2015 campaign.

Returning Clubs

Kasetsart University is returning to the league after a 1-year break.

Stadium and locations

League table

 BCC Tero deducted 15 points for fielding an ineligible player.

See also
 2015 Thai Premier League
 2015 Thai Division 1 League
 2015 Regional League Division 2
 2015 Thai FA Cup
 2015 Thai League Cup
 2015 Kor Royal Cup

References

External links
  Kondivision 2

Regional League Bangkok Area Division seasons